In United States administrative law, deferred action is an immigration status which the executive branch can grant to illegal immigrants. This does not give them legal status, but can indefinitely delay their deportation. Deferred action is an exercise of the executive branch's enforcement discretion and was first publicly defined in a 1975 administrative guidance document published by the Immigration and Naturalization Service.

Major grants of deferred action include:

 Family Fairness Program, a program launched by President Ronald Reagan in 1987, and expanded by President George H. W. Bush in 1990, which granted deferred action to spouses and children of immigrants granted amnesty under the Immigration Reform and Control Act of 1986.
 Deferred Action for Childhood Arrivals, a 2012 program launched by President Barack Obama aimed at unauthorized immigrants who arrived in the United States as children.
 Deferred Action for Parental Accountability, a 2014 Obama administration program for immigrants who have citizen or permanent resident children.

References 

United States immigration law